The Bananal Ecological Station is an Ecological station in the state of São Paulo, Brazil.

Location

The Bananal Ecological Station is in the municipality of Bananal, São Paulo.
It is in a region of the Serra da Bocaina with sharp relief.
It is part of the  Bocaina Mosaic, created in 2006.
Visitors must obtain permission from the station's management, who will assign an employee as a guide.
There is a short  trail to the last fall of the Sete Quedas waterfalls, a scenic attraction.

Environment

The climate is humid subtropical, with three dry months in the year.
The ecological station contains remnants of Atlantic Forest.
Vegetation includes cloud forest and dense montane and submontane rainforest.
Two new species of bromeliad have only been found in the station, Neoregelia pontuali and Wittrockia corallina.

History

The Bananal State Forest Reserve was created by state decree 43.193 of 3 April 1964 to conserve the forest and preserve the flora and fauna.
On 12 March 1987 governor André Franco Montoro altered the category of the reserve to create the Bananal Ecological Station.
The station is funded in partnership between the São Paulo secretariat of the environment and the German KfW bank.

Notes

Sources

Ecological stations of Brazil
Protected areas of São Paulo (state)
1987 establishments in Brazil
Protected areas established in 1987
Protected areas of the Atlantic Forest